Microdessus atomarius is a species of beetle in the family Dytiscidae, the only species in the genus Microdessus.

References

Dytiscidae